The Baltimore Orioles were a 19th-century professional baseball team that competed from  to , first in the American Association and later in the National League. This early Orioles franchise, which featured six players (Wilbert Robinson--C, Dan Brouthers--1B, Hughie Jennings--SS, John McGraw--3B, "Wee Willie" Keeler--RF, and Joe Kelley--LF) and a manager (Ned Hanlon) who would become future inductees to the National Baseball Hall of Fame, finished in first place for three consecutive seasons (1894–1896) and won the Temple Cup national championship series in 1896 and 1897.

Despite their success, the dominant Orioles were contracted out of the National League after the 1899 season, when the league reduced in size from 12 members to eight. Upon the foundation of the American League in 1901, a reorganized Baltimore Orioles franchise competed as a charter member, before relocating to New York City after two seasons, where they were replaced by the team that is better known as the New York Yankees.

History
The team (formally the "Baltimore Base Ball and Exhibition Company") was founded in 1882 as a charter member of the American Association, which was then a major league. After several years of mediocrity, the team dropped out of the league after the 1889 season, but re-joined in 1890 to replace the Brooklyn Gladiators when that last-place team dropped out during the season. The Orioles were one of four AA clubs merged into the National League in 1892 (formally as a 12-member "League Association"). The beginnings of what was to become a legendary team can be traced to June 1892, when Harry Von der Horst hired Ned Hanlon to manage the Orioles giving him stock in the team and full authority over baseball operations. Ned moved his growing family to a house that stood a block away from Union Park.

After two years finishing near the bottom of the league, the Orioles won three consecutive pennants with several future Hall of Famers under player/manager Ned Hanlon from 1894 to 1896. They followed up the title run with two consecutive second-place finishes. Accordingly, they participated in all four editions of the post-season Temple Cup series, winning the final two in 1896 and 1897.

After the team's 1898 second-place finish, Hanlon and most of the team's stars were moved to the Brooklyn Dodgers of the National League by the joint ownership of the clubs. Third baseman John McGraw and catcher Wilbert Robinson remained in Baltimore, with McGraw remaining as first-year player/manager. Following a fourth-place finish in 1899, the Orioles were one of four clubs eliminated by the National League. In the 8-team National League of 1900, McGraw and Robinson joined the St. Louis Cardinals.

(Those newly formed A.L. Orioles only stayed in Baltimore for two seasons before being moved to New York as "the price of peace" as agreement was established in 1903 between the older circuit and its new upstart rival allowing the "Americans" to have a representative also in the "Big Apple" as a sign of respectability. The old Oriole franchise under McGraw became known as the "New York Highlanders" or occasionally the "New York Americans", later becoming renamed in 1913 as the New York Yankees.)

Ballpark
The Orioles played briefly at the old Oriole Park, in Harwood, south of the Waverly neighborhood at 29th and Barclay Streets, (just a block west from Greenmount Avenue) from 1890 to 1891. (The 1901 AL Orioles-turned-Highlanders would play at the site a decade later.) During the 1891 season, the Orioles moved a few blocks away to Union Park on Huntington Avenue (later renamed 25th Street) and Greenmount Avenue, where they would play and win their famous three straight championships for the old "Temple Cup" in 1894–1895-1896. Unfortunately they were removed from the N.L. roster after the 1899 season when the League was controversially reduced from 12 team franchises to 8, which endured for the next half-century. For further info see List of baseball parks in Baltimore, Maryland.

Stars

The original Orioles were one of the most storied teams in the history of the game. Managed by Ned Hanlon, they won NL pennants in 1894, 1895 and 1896, and sported some of the most colorful players in history including John McGraw, Wee Willie Keeler, Hughie Jennings, Joe Kelley, Wilbert Robinson, and Dan Brouthers.

They were rough characters who practically invented "scientific" baseball, the form of baseball played before the home run became the norm in the 1920s.  Like the style known today as "small ball", the "inside baseball" strategy of Orioles featured tight pitching, hit and run tactics, stolen bases, and precise bunting. One such play, where the batter deliberately strikes the pitched ball downward onto the infield surface with sufficient force such that the ball rebounds skyward, allowing the batter to reach first base safely before the opposing team can field the ball, remains known as a Baltimore Chop.

Matt Kilroy pitched a no-hitter for the Orioles on October 6, 1886. Bill Hawke threw one on August 16, 1893, the first from the modern pitching distance of 60 feet, 6 inches. Jay Hughes threw a no-hitter for the Orioles on April 22, 1898.

Instead of "flying spikes," it was really "flying mouths" that most made the 1890s Orioles stand out.

Baseball Hall of Famers

References

External links 
 Team index at Baseball Reference
 Excerpt from Where They Ain't: The Fabled Life And Untimely Death Of The Original Baltimore Orioles by Burt Solomon at BaseballLibrary.com

Sources
 Solomon, Burt (1999), Where They Ain't: The Fabled Life And Untimely Death Of The Original Baltimore Orioles. New York: Free Press. 
Rosenberg, Howard W. (2005); Cap Anson 3: Muggsy John McGraw and the Tricksters: Baseball's Fun Age of Rule Bending. Arlington, Virginia: Tile Books.

See also
History of the New York Yankees
History of the Baltimore Orioles
Inside Baseball

 
Baseball teams established in 1882
Baseball teams disestablished in 1899
Sports teams in Baltimore
American Association (1882–1891) baseball teams
1882 establishments in Maryland
1899 disestablishments in Maryland
Defunct baseball teams in Maryland
Professional baseball teams in Maryland